Matthew 14:27 is a verse in the fourteenth chapter of the Gospel of Matthew in the New Testament.

Content
In the original Greek according to Westcott-Hort for this verse is:
Εὐθέως δὲ ἐλάλησεν αὐτοῖς ὁ Ἰησοῦς, λέγων, Θαρσεῖτε· ἐγώ εἰμι· μὴ φοβεῖσθε.  

In the King James Version of the Bible the text reads:
But straightway Jesus spake unto them, saying, Be of good cheer; it is I; be not afraid.

The New International Version translates the passage as:
But Jesus immediately said to them: "Take courage! It is I. Don't be afraid."

Analysis
The phrase "it is I," seems to be a reference to Exodus 3, "I am who I am." Jesus tells his disciples to take heart, since he is present there is nothing to be afraid of.

Commentary from the Church Fathers
Chrysostom: "Christ then did not reveal Himself to His disciples until they cried out; for the more intense their fear, the more did they rejoice in His presence; whence it follows, And immediately Jesus spoke to them, saying, Be of good cheer, it is I, be not afraid. This speech took away their fear, and prepared their confidence."

References

External links
Other translations of Matthew 14:27 at BibleHub

14:27